Henry Alfred Cumberbatch  (27 June 1858 – 3 December 1918) was a British diplomat who served as a Consul in Romania, Turkey and Lebanon.

Life and career
Cumberbatch was born in Berdiansk, (then part of the Russian Empire, now Ukraine), the son of Robert William Cumberbatch, who was Consul there, and his wife Louisa Grace (née Hanson). He was educated at Christ's College, Finchley.

August 1, 1876, at the age of 18, Cumberbatch was appointed student dragoman in the Embassy in Constantinople. Cumberbatch followed his father into the diplomatic service, being appointed Vice-Consul at Bucharest, Romania, on 26 July 1879, later transferring to Sulina, before being promoted to Consul at Adrianople in the Ottoman Empire (now Edirne, Turkey) on 20 March 1888. He was transferred to Angora on 22 July 1893, and while serving as Consul there was made a Companion of the Order of St Michael and St George on 20 May 1896. He was appointed Consul at Smyrna (now Izmir, Turkey) on 18 November 1896, and Consul-General there from 1 April 1900. Cumberbatch was mentioned by Gertrude Bell in her works after a meeting in 1907. On 22 January 1908 Cumberbatch was appointed Consul-General for the Vilayet of Beirut and the Mutessariflik of the Lebanon, resident at Beirut, serving there until 1914.

Cumberbatch died 3rd December 1918 and was buried 7 December 1918 at Brompton Cemetery, London.

Personal life
Cumberbatch married Helene Gertrude Rees, daughter of Thomas Bowen Rees and American born Ida Josephine Langdon, in Smyrna on 16 January 1891. Their children were:
 Major Robert Cecil Cumberbatch (1892–1963)
 Ida Sybil Cumberbatch (1895–1947)
 Captain Sir Hugh Douglas Cumberbatch (1897–1951)
 Commander Henry Carlton Cumberbatch RN (1900–1966)
 Nancy Mary Cumberbatch (1905–1948)

Present descendants include his great-grandson, actor Benedict Cumberbatch, son of actor Timothy Carlton and grandson of Henry Carlton as well as descendants of Robert Cecil who married Nora Skender of Athens and Ida Sybil who married Henry Alwyn Barker of Alexandria.

References

External links
 

1858 births
1918 deaths
People from Berdiansk
British diplomats
Companions of the Order of St Michael and St George
Henry Arnold